Goode Behavior is an American sitcom that premiered August 26, 1996, on UPN. The series was cancelled after one season, airing its last episode on May 19, 1997, for a total of 22 episodes.

Synopsis
Willie Goode (Sherman Hemsley) is a newly paroled convicted con artist. He is also the father of Franklin Goode (Dorien Wilson), his estranged son. Franklin is a college professor and is in the process of being promoted to Dean of Humanities at Chapel Hill University in Chapel Hill, North Carolina. The two must peacefully co-exist when Willie arrives at Franklin's house unannounced to fulfill the conditions of his probation; he must live at his son's house, under house arrest. Caught in the middle of the family feuding are Franklin's wife Barbara (Alex Datcher), a local news anchor, and their teenage daughter Bianca (Bianca Lawson).

Cast

Main
 Sherman Hemsley as Willie Goode
 Alex Datcher as Barbara Goode
 Bianca Lawson as Bianca Goode
 Scott Grimes as Garth
 Joseph Maher as Chancellor Willoughby
 Dorien Wilson as Franklin Goode

Recurring
 Justina Machado as Raquel De La Rosa
 Marc McClure as Harry Danielson
 Gabrielle Union as Tracy Monaghan

Episodes

References

External links

1996 American television series debuts
1997 American television series endings
1990s American black sitcoms
1990s American sitcoms
UPN original programming
English-language television shows
Television series by CBS Studios
Television shows set in North Carolina